The Bletchingly Stakes is a Melbourne Racing Club Group 3 Thoroughbred horse race held under Weight for age conditions, over a distance of 1200 metres at Caulfield Racecourse, Melbourne, Australia annually in July and is the last Group race held in Melbourne each season. Total prizemoney for the race is A$200,000.

History

Name
The race was first held in 1992 and is named in honour of the former champion racehorse and sire Bletchingly.

Venue
 1994–2016: Caulfield Racecourse
 2017: Sandown Racecourse
 2018 onwards: Caulfield Racecourse

Distance
 1994–2003 – 1100 metres
 2004 onwards - 1200 metres

Grade
 1994–1996 - Listed race
 1997 - Group 3 status

Winners

 2022 - King Of Sparta
 2021 - Sansom
 2020 - Viridine
 2019 - Scales Of Justice
 2018 - Vega Magic
 2017 - Ability
 2016 - Lord Of The Sky
 2015 - Smokin' Joey
 2014 - Thiamandi
 2013 - Second Effort
 2012 - Ready To Rip
 2011 - Mid Summer Music
 2010 - Shoot Out
 2009 - Let Go Thommo
 2008 - Commanding Hope
 2007 - Apache Cat
 2006 - Minson
 2005 - Regal Roller
 2004 - Le Zagaletta
 2003 - Super Elegant
 2002 - Rubitano
 2001 - Windigo
 2000 - Dandy Kid
 1999 - Sports
 1998 - Jugulator
 1997 - Blazing Reality
 1996 - You Remember
 1995 - You Remember
 1994 - Poetic King

See also
 List of Australian Group races
 Group races

References

Horse races in Australia
Open sprint category horse races
Caulfield Racecourse